Campofelice di Fitalia (Sicilian: Campufilici di Fitalia) is a comune (municipality) in the Metropolitan City of Palermo in the Italian region Sicily, located about  southeast of Palermo.

Campofelice di Fitalia borders the following municipalities: Ciminna, Corleone, Mezzojuso, Prizzi, Vicari.

Famous people

Timoteo Giovanni Borghese
Mike Bongiorno

Demographic evolution

References

Municipalities of the Metropolitan City of Palermo